Milano Dateo is an underground railway station in Milan, Italy. It opened in 2002 as part of the Milan Passante railway. It is located under Piazzale Dateo.

Services 
Milano Dateo is served by lines S1, S2, S5, S6, S12 and S13 of the Milan suburban railway network, operated by the Lombard railway company Trenord. It is connected to the M4 metro station of the same name since November 26, 2022, providing a direct link to Linate Airport.

See also 
Railway stations in Milan
Milan suburban railway network
Milan Passante railway
Milan Metro Line 4

References

External links 

Dateo
Railway stations opened in 2002
Milan S Lines stations
2002 establishments in Italy
Railway stations located underground in Italy
Railway stations in Italy opened in the 21st century